Dianne Fae Yates (born 29 November 1943) is a New Zealand politician. She is a member of the Labour Party.

Member of Parliament

Yates first entered Parliament in the 1993 election, representing the Hamilton East electorate. In the 1996 election, she was defeated in Hamilton East by National's Tony Steel, but remained in Parliament as a list MP. She recaptured Hamilton East again in the 2002 election by a majority of 614 votes. However, in the 2005 election she lost the seat to National's David Bennett by a significant 5,298 votes, and again became a list MP. In August 2007, she announced that she would retire from Parliament by the end of the year in order to stand for the Hamilton City Council. This she did, but she was unsuccessful, finishing 7th.

She was expected to be replaced by Louisa Wall, the next candidate on Labour's list, but Wall entered parliament as a replacement for Ann Hartley. Dianne Yates gave her valedictory statement to Parliament on 19 March 2008 and left Parliament on 29 March 2008. William Sio, who ranked 47th on the Labour Party list in the 2005 parliamentary election, became a member of Parliament on 1 April 2008 as the next person on Labour's list.

Notes

References
Dianne Yates on Parliamentary website

1943 births
Living people
New Zealand Labour Party MPs
Women members of the New Zealand House of Representatives
New Zealand list MPs
New Zealand MPs for North Island electorates
Members of the New Zealand House of Representatives
21st-century New Zealand politicians
21st-century New Zealand women politicians